Rings (known in Japan as The Ring: Rebirth and in Latin America as The Ring 3) is a 2017 American supernatural horror film directed by F. Javier Gutiérrez, written by David Loucka, Jacob Aaron Estes and Akiva Goldsman and starring Matilda Lutz, Alex Roe, Johnny Galecki, Aimee Teegarden, Bonnie Morgan and Vincent D'Onofrio. It is the third and final installment in The Ring series, following The Ring (2002) and The Ring Two (2005); it is based on elements of Spiral by Kōji Suzuki.

Paramount Pictures had initially planned a third film, originally titled The Ring 3D, in early 2014, with Gutiérrez signed to direct the film from a screenplay written by Goldsman, Loucka, and Estes. Rings was released in the United States on February 3, 2017, and opened #2 in the box office. The film grossed $83million worldwide against its $25million budget.

Plot 
In 2013, on an airplane bound for Seattle, Carter reveals that he has watched Samara Morgan's cursed videotape. Kelly reveals she has seen the tape too, and asks Carter if he made a copy; he replies that he did not. Moments later, Samara causes the airplane to crash, killing Carter and everyone else aboard.

Two years later in 2015, a college professor, Gabriel Brown, buys Carter’s old VCR, discovering the videotape inside. Elsewhere, a student, Julia, sees her boyfriend, Holt, off to college, but she grows concerned when he ghosts her. Soon, a panicked girl, Skye, contacts her, she too is concerned about Holt. When Julia goes looking for Holt, she meets Gabriel, and finds a group of people known as the Sevens, who are involved in an experiment involving the cursed video. The Sevens film themselves watching the video before passing the footage to another person called a "tail".

Julia recognizes Skye instantly. She goes with Skye to her apartment to unknowingly watch the video. When Skye tries to force her to watch the video, Julia locks herself in the bathroom. Samara kills Skye in the apartment. Julia tries to rush out of the apartment, and when finally opening the door, she finds Holt on the other side. Holt reveals that he has watched the tape as well, and has 12 hours left. Julia watches his copy, and when she picks up the phone, she experiences a vision of a door. The phone burns a mark into her hand. Julia's version of the video cannot be copied, and contains additional images of a mysterious woman. She realizes they must cremate Samara's physical remains.

Gabriel photocopies the mark on Julia's hand and sends them to Sacrament Valley, where Samara was given a proper burial after the residents of Moesko Island refused to accept the remains. Julia and Holt find an unmarked tomb, but when they break in, they find it empty. They are caught and taken to a blind man named Galen Burke, who claims Samara's body was entombed by a local priest, but a flood came, leading the priest to rebury her in a potter's field outside town.

On the way to the field, Julia and Holt come upon a car crash, and learn that Gabriel was involved. He had realized the mark on Julia's hand is Braille and translated it. However, he is killed by a falling utility pole before he could warn them. After experiencing a vision of Evelyn, Julia and Holt return to town. Julia goes to the church, and discovers a hidden chamber beneath the bell tower. She finds evidence that Evelyn was imprisoned there while pregnant: held in captivity by the priest after being raped. She escaped eight months into the pregnancy.

Holt learns that Galen is the priest. Julia separately visits Galen, and explains her findings. He attacks her, revealing he is the priest as well as Samara's biological father. He blinded himself to escape the reach of her powers. Julia pushes him down the stairs, temporarily incapacitating him. Holt rushes to Galen's house, where he is knocked unconscious. Julia discovers Samara's skeleton behind a wall, and Galen tries to strangle her to prevent her from cremating Samara's remains. He claims that the cremation would unleash an unspeakable evil upon the world, and that he has killed several people who previously attempted to do the same. Suddenly, a swarm of cicadas fly in, summoning Samara through Julia's phone. Samara cures Galen's blindness, and kills him. Holt recovers and rushes to Julia's aid. That night, he and Julia cremate Samara's corpse, in an attempt to appease her spirit once and for all, and return home.

While Julia is in the shower, Holt notices a voicemail from Gabriel, who warns him of the Braille, which Holt begins to translate. In the bathroom, Julia peels away the skin where the mark was, revealing grey skin underneath. She begins to cough up black hair, from which a cicada is born. Meanwhile, Julia's copy of the cursed video is sent to everyone on her contact list, eventually going viral, despite Holt's futile attempts to disconnect the computer. As his computer glitches, the Braille translation is revealed to be "rebirth". Samara is reborn in Julia, who sees Samara's face in her mirror instead of her own.

Cast

Production

Development
In 2014, Paramount Pictures announced the third entry in the The Ring series, peoginally titled The Ring 3D, with F. Javier Gutiérrez directing, after vacating the Crow remake. In August, Paramount was in talks with Akiva Goldsman to write a third draft of the screenplay, which had previously been worked on by David Loucka and Jacob Aaron Estes. In November, Gutiérrez posted an Instagram photo that showed that the title of the sequel had been changed to Rings.

Casting
Matilda Lutz was cast in the lead role, while Alex Roe was cast as the male lead. Aimee Teegarden joined the cast and Johnny Galecki was cast as Gabriel, a professor who mentors and helps both Holt and Julia.

Filming 
Principal photography on the film began on March 23, 2015, in Atlanta, and wrapped on May 31. Reshoots took place in July 2016.

Post-production 
Post-production began in June 2015 at Paramount Studios, and was concluded in November 2016.

Release 
Paramount Pictures originally set the film for a November 13, 2015, release, but the film was pulled from the schedule, and rescheduled the release date to April 1, 2016. The film was rescheduled again for release on October 28, 2016, to take the place of Paramount's previous October horror release staple, the Paranormal Activity series, which ended in 2015 with Paranormal Activity: The Ghost Dimension at the time. The film was delayed to February 3, 2017, most likely to avoid competition with Ouija: Origin of Evil, leaving the latter as the only horror film that debuted around Halloween 2016.

Marketing
Paramount released two trailers to promote the film. The second international trailer contained new footage. In addition, Paramount released a prank video where an actress dressed as Samara jumped out of a television to scare unwitting patrons at an electronics store. The video garnered 200million views in 24 hours on Facebook.

Home media
Rings was released on digital HD on April 21 and on Blu-ray and DVD on May 2, 2017. The digital HD and Blu-ray releases include behind-the-scenes interviews with the cast & crew, deleted/extended scenes, and an alternate ending.

Reception

Box office
Rings grossed $27.8million in the United States and Canada and $55.3million in other territories for a worldwide total of $83.1million, against a production budget of $25million.

In North America, the film was released alongside The Space Between Us and The Comedian, and was projected to gross $12–14million from about 3,000 theaters in its opening weekend. It made $800,000 from its Thursday night previews. It went on to open to $13million, finishing second at the box office behind fellow horror film Split.

Critical response
On Rotten Tomatoes, the film has an approval rating of 8% based on 113 reviews and an average rating of 3.30/10. The site's critical consensus reads, "Rings may offer ardent fans of the franchise a few threadbare thrills, but for everyone else, it may feel like an endless loop of muddled mythology and rehashed plot points". On Metacritic, the film has a score of 25 out of 100 based on 23 critics, indicating "generally unfavorable reviews". Audiences polled by CinemaScore gave the film an average grade of "C−" on an A+ to F scale, lower than the B– and C+ earned by its respective predecessors.

Alex Gilyadov of IGN gave the film a score 4.5/10, stating that it "opts for lazy jump scares and a convoluted origins story no one asked for or needed", though not dismissing that it has "some chilling scenes and creepy visuals". Hernan Khatchadourian of Diario Popular described the movie as "more entertaining than the long movie by Verbinsky", praising the cinematography, direction, and acting. Peter Travers of Rolling Stone gave the movie zero stars and called it a "botch job" that suffers from "demo-worthy awfulness in directing, writing and acting". Peter Sobczynski of RogerEbert.com gave a single star, calling it "more wearying than frightening". A.A. Dowd of The A.V. Club commented that the film was a pale imitation of the 2002 American remake in terms of visuals and plot structure. He also dismissed the film's characters as "bland nothings", citing their lack of development in the story. John Squires from Bloody Disgusting "dug Rings quite a bit", suggesting that "the movie itself is actually way better than its clearly-intended-for-teen-audiences marketing", and the reveal of the final scene in the trailer was "completely robbed of suspense by the marketing department".

Other international critics applauded the film. Mike McCahill of The Guardian commented that the film "smoothly reinvents the wheel", pointing out that "the admirably loopy finale, involving blind Vincent d'Onofrio's swarming army of cicadas, is worthy of one of the better Exorcist sequels". Javier Jimenez Montoya of Vavel also praised the film, stating that "it's a step forward in the horror genre" and applauding "its strong, surprising ending".

The generally negative critical reception in the US, along with its lower-than-expected US box office intake, was partially blamed by some critics and fans for the cancellation of Paramount's newest installment of the Friday the 13th franchise.

The final numbers in the global box office pushed Paramount to consider making another film in the Ring franchise.

Future
Speaking at CinemaCon, Paramount Vice Chairman Rob Moore said that should the film prove successful, more sequels could recur annually, taking the place of Paramount's Paranormal Activity series. These plans were left in doubt following Moore's departure from the company. In a post-release interview, Moore's successor, Megan Colligan, said that "time will tell" if another sequel is in the cards. Following Colligan's departure, there has been no update on a sequel.

In September 2019, The Grudge (2020) director Nicolas Pesce expressed interest in a crossover film between The Grudge and the American The Ring film series, akin to Sadako vs. Kayako (2016).

References

External links 
 
 
 
 
 

2017 films
2017 horror films
2010s ghost films
2010s psychological horror films
American ghost films
American psychological horror films
American sequel films
American supernatural horror films
Asian-American horror films
Films about spirit possession
Films scored by Matthew Margeson
Films set in 2013
Films set in 2015
Films set on airplanes
Films shot in Atlanta
Paramount Pictures films
Patricide in fiction
Rape and revenge films
The Ring (franchise)
Films with screenplays by Akiva Goldsman
Films produced by Walter F. Parkes
Vertigo Entertainment films
2010s English-language films
2010s American films
2010s Japanese films